Annamanum irregulare is a species of beetle in the family Cerambycidae. It was described by Maurice Pic in 1925. It is known from Cambodia.

References

Annamanum
Beetles described in 1925